Constantia  or Konstantia was a town of some importance in the province Osrhoene in Mesopotamia, on the road between Nisibis and Carrhae, at no great distance from Edessa. It was, after his departure from Nisibis, the residence of the dux Mesopotamiae until the foundation of Dara. There is considerable variation in different authors in the way in which the name of this town is written and the names under which it is known, including: Constantia or Konstantia (Κωνσταντία), Constantina or Konstantina (Κωνσταντίνα), Antoninopolis, Nicephorium or Nikephorion (Νικηφόριον), Maximianopolis (Μαξιμιανούπολις), Constantinopolis in Osrhoene, Tella and Antiochia Arabis, Antiochia in Mesopotamia ( – Antiocheia tes Mesopotamias) and Antiochia in Arabia ( – Antiocheia e Arabike).

According to Pliny it was founded by Seleucus I Nicator after the death of Alexander the Great. According to the Byzantine historian John Malalas, the city was built by the Roman Emperor Constantine I on the site of former Maximianopolis, which had been destroyed by a Persian attack and an earthquake. Jacob Baradaeus was born near the city and was a monk in a nearby monastery.

Under the names Constantina and Tella, it was also a bishopric, suffragan of Edessa; some names of early bishops have been preserved, including Sophronius who attended the Council of Antioch in 445. No longer a residential bishop, it remains a titular see of the Roman Catholic Church under the name Constantina. The city was captured by the Arabs in 639.

Its site is near the modern Viranşehir, Turkey.

References

 Blue Guide, Turkey,, p. 585.

Attribution:

Populated places in Osroene
Former populated places in Turkey
Populated places of the Byzantine Empire
Roman towns and cities in Turkey
Catholic titular sees in Asia
Ancient Greek archaeological sites in Turkey
Seleucid colonies in Anatolia
Geography of Şanlıurfa Province
History of Şanlıurfa Province